The 1983 All-Ireland Junior Hurling Championship was the 62nd staging of the All-Ireland Junior Championship since its establishment by the Gaelic Athletic Association in 1912.

Derry entered the championship as the defending champions.

The All-Ireland final was played on 25 September 1983 at the Gaelic Grounds in Limerick, between Cork and Galway, in what was their first meeting in the final since 1940. Cork won the match by 3-14 to 2-15 to claim their ninth championship title overall and a first title since 1958.

Results

Leinster Junior Hurling Championship

Leinster semi-finals

Leinster final

Munster Junior Hurling Championship

Munster quarter-finals

Munster semi-finals

Munster final

Ulster  Junior Hurling Championship

Ulster quarter-finals

Ulster semi-finals

Ulster final

All-Ireland Junior Hurling Championship

All-Ireland semi-finals

All-Ireland final

References

Junior
All-Ireland Junior Hurling Championship